Zoumana Koné (born 27 October 1991) is an Ivorian footballer who plays as a forward for French club Vendée Fontenay.

Club career
A journeyman striker, Koné was the top scorer in the 2013–14 Botola with 11 goals for HUSA. On 12 February 2019, Koné signed with Niort in the French Ligue 2.

References

External links
Soccerway Profile
FDB Profile

1991 births
Living people
Footballers from Abidjan
Ivorian footballers
Association football forwards
FCSR Haguenau players
Chamois Niortais F.C. players
Hassania Agadir players
Al-Ahli SC (Tripoli) players
AS Denguélé players
Al-Shaab CSC players
Al-Orouba SC players
TVEC Les Sables-d'Olonne players
Vendée Fontenay Foot players
Ligue 2 players
Oman Professional League players
UAE Pro League players
Botola players
Ivorian expatriate footballers
Ivorian expatriate sportspeople in France
Ivorian expatriate sportspeople in Oman
Ivorian expatriate sportspeople in the United Arab Emirates
Ivorian expatriates in Morocco
Ivorian expatriates in Libya
Expatriate footballers in France
Expatriate footballers in Oman
Expatriate footballers in the United Arab Emirates
Expatriate footballers in Morocco
Expatriate footballers in Libya
Libyan Premier League players
Ivory Coast A' international footballers
Ivorian expatriate sportspeople in Morocco
2011 African Nations Championship players